K. Rajah Pillai was an Indian politician and former Member of the Legislative Assembly. He was elected to the Tamil Nadu legislative assembly as a Dravida Munnetra Kazhagam candidate from Kanyakumari constituency in Kanyakumari district in 1971 election.
He was social activist and was liked by all the people of Nagercoil.

References 

People from Kanyakumari district
Dravida Munnetra Kazhagam politicians
Members of the Tamil Nadu Legislative Assembly
Year of birth missing
Year of death missing